Clinidium microfossatum is a species of ground beetle in the subfamily Rhysodinae. It was described by R.T. Bell & J.R. Bell in 1985. Clinidium microfossatum is known from Martinique (Lesser Antilles). The holotype, a male, measures  in length.

References

Clinidium
Beetles of North America
Endemic fauna of Martinique
Beetles described in 1985